The 1908–09 season was Madrid Football Club's 7th season in existence. The club played some friendly matches against local clubs. They also played in the Campeonato Regional de Madrid (Madrid Regional Championship). Madrid FC finished runner-up in the Campeonato, and as a result, failed to qualify for the Copa del Rey for the first time since the tournament began in 1903.

Summary
 4 January: Real Madrid became one of the founding sides of the Royal Spanish Football Federation on 4 January 1909, when club president Adolfo Meléndez signed the foundation agreement of the Spanish FA.

Friendlies

Competitions

Overview

Campeonato Regional de Madrid

League table

Matches

Tiebreakers
Español de Madrid won the Madrid Championship and qualified for the 1909 Copa del Rey. However, the remaining teams were tied on points and decided to play against each other to resolve the tie. Madrid FC won both tiebreaker matches and finished the tournament as runners-up.

Notes

References

External links
Realmadrid.com Official Site

Real Madrid
Real Madrid CF seasons